Mark L. Failla is an American health nutritionist, focusing in digestion, absorption, intestinal metabolism, bioactive compounds, gut health and bioavailability, currently a Professor Emeritus at Ohio State University and an Elected Fellow of the American Association for the Advancement of Science.

References

Year of birth missing (living people)
Living people
Fellows of the American Association for the Advancement of Science
Ohio State University faculty
American nutritionists
St. Francis College alumni
Indiana University alumni